The Battle of Nuremberg (also known as the Massacre of Nuremberg) is the nickname of a football match played in the round of 16 of the 2006 FIFA World Cup between Portugal and the Netherlands at the Frankenstadion in Nuremberg on 25 June 2006. Russian referee Valentin Ivanov issued a FIFA World Cup record four red cards and 16 yellow cards, setting a new record for cards shown at any FIFA-administered international tournament.

Background
Portugal and the Netherlands had met at the semi-final stage of the previous major tournament, UEFA Euro 2004 held in Portugal, which had finished 2–1 to the host nation, but had not featured the same level of animosity between the players. A total of five Dutch and eleven Portuguese players who took some part in that fixture were also on the field in Nuremberg.

The match

First half
Mark van Bommel was booked in the second minute, and also before the goal Dutch defender Khalid Boulahrouz was booked for a foul, which injured Cristiano Ronaldo and would eventually force the substitution of Portugal's star winger before half time. Ronaldo left in tears, and proceeded to describe Boulahrouz's tackle as "clearly an intentional foul to get me injured." In the meantime, Maniche had been booked for a foul on Van Bommel after 19 minutes.

Shortly after the goal, Portugal's defensive midfielder Costinha slid into Dutch veteran Philip Cocu, receiving a yellow card. He was then the first to be sent off just before half time after being shown a second yellow card for a handball.

Second half
After Petit had been cautioned in the 50th minute, Giovanni van Bronckhorst and Luís Figo both received yellow cards, with Figo's coming as a result of a touchline melee with Mark Van Bommel during which Figo headbutted him. Portugal manager Luiz Felipe Scolari controversially gave his approval to this headbutt by stating after the match, "Jesus Christ may be able to turn the other cheek but Luís Figo isn't Jesus Christ."

Boulahrouz was sent off in the 63rd minute with a second caution after fouling Figo, which sparked a melee on the touch-line, involving Boulahrouz (who confronted Simão), André Ooijer and the Portuguese bench, necessitating the intervention of the fourth official Marco Rodríguez. Portugal's playmaker Deco roughly fouled Dutch defender John Heitinga and was booked; the Netherlands had not given the ball back after Portugal had cleared it into touch to allow a player to receive medical treatment, thus breaking one of football's gentlemen's agreements. In the ensuing brawl, Wesley Sneijder pushed Petit to the ground and was also cautioned. The Netherlands' Rafael van der Vaart received a yellow card, apparently for dissent.

After that, Portugal's goalkeeper Ricardo (presumably for time wasting) and left-back Nuno Valente (for a rough foul) were punished. Deco received his second caution and was dismissed in the 78th minute for delaying the restart after a free-kick was awarded. Cocu escaped a caution for wrestling Deco to the ground in his attempt to retrieve the ball. In the 88th minute, Simão drew the ire of the Dutch goalkeeper Edwin van der Sar, after the Portuguese player's leg made contact with Dutchman's in his attempt to score a goal, but the referee decided against taking any disciplinary action. In injury time, Van Bronckhorst was sent off for a second yellow card for a foul on Tiago.

A scene was shown on television footage during the match in which Boulahrouz, Deco, and Van Bronckhorst were sitting together on the sidelines after being sent off, the latter two having a discussion, both being teammates at Spanish club Barcelona. Commentator Gary Bloom referred to the scene as the "Bad boys' corner".

Aftermath

In the aftermath of the match, referee Ivanov was criticised by FIFA president Sepp Blatter, who suggested that Ivanov should have given himself a yellow card for his poor performance during the match. Blatter later regretted these words and promised to apologise officially. FIFA announced that Ivanov would referee no further matches in the tournament. Ivanov's father Valentin Ivanov defended his son, saying it had been FIFA's demand for referees to be tough on the players.

When Portugal faced England in the subsequent quarter-final, they were without the suspended Deco and Costinha. Portugal managed to reach the semi-finals. However, they had two players suspended for that match due to accumulated yellow cards, including the ones against the Netherlands.

The record for yellow cards in a World Cup game would be surpassed in 2022, when Antonio Mateu Lahoz issued a total of 18 yellow cards during the quarter-final match between the Netherlands and Argentina.

Match details

See also
 2006 FIFA World Cup disciplinary record
Battle of Berne
 Battle of Bordeaux
 Battle of Bramall Lane
 Battle of Old Trafford
 Battle of the Buffet, a.k.a. Battle of Old Trafford II
 Battle of Highbury
 Battle of Santiago
 List of FIFA World Cup records
 Controversy - Portugal vs. Netherlands (round of 16)

References
General
 
Specific

2006 FIFA World Cup
FIFA World Cup matches
2006
2006
Brawls in team sports
Portugal at the 2006 FIFA World Cup
Port
Netherlands–Portugal relations
Sports competitions in Nuremberg
June 2006 sports events in Europe
Nicknamed sporting events
FIFA World Cup controversies